Giorgio Galli is an Italian watch designer, and current   chief creative director for Timex Group.  His design studio is in Milano, Italy. Galli has worked for Swatch, Citizen Watch and Ebel and Seiko.

References

Living people
Year of birth missing (living people)